The Silas L. Brown House, at 107 S. Seminole in Wewoka, Oklahoma, was built in 1985.  It was listed on the National Register of Historic Places in 1985.

It was deemed significant for association with Silas L. Brown, the first black dentist in Wewoka, and as one of the oldest and best-preserved homes in the black community of Wewoka.

It has a one-story open porch and a one-story wing.

References

		
National Register of Historic Places in Seminole County, Oklahoma